Tipanaea is a genus of moths of the family Crambidae.

Species
Tipanaea intactella Walker, 1863
Tipanaea patulella Walker, 1863

References

Natural History Museum Lepidoptera genus database

Schoenobiinae
Crambidae genera
Taxa named by Francis Walker (entomologist)